Maurice II de Craon (–1196) was Lord of Craon, Governor of Anjou and Maine under Henry II, a military figure and Anglo-Norman of the  century. Maurice II also possessed fiefs in England which he held courtesy of Henry II.

Biography

Knighthood

Maurice II, son of Hugues I de Craon and of Marquise, his second wife, succeeded his brother around 1150. Still a minor, he received his knighthood on acceptance of the fief. Maurice II's earliest military action was his participation in the siege staged by Henry II of the city of Thouars, which was taken 10 October 1158.

Crusade

A few years later, Maurice II left for the Crusade. This act, known from the reference in charter 231 of La Roë Abbey of the first court held by him at Poiltrée at Christmas time, after his return from Jerusalem, is furthermore attested by ten items of the Cartulaire de Craon. Maurice II thus returned to France after the month of March 1170.

He took several risks whilst in the Orient and, in executing an oath made abroad, in Egypto, he established an annuity of two sous for the benefit of the Collégiale Saint-Nicolas de Craon to contribute towards the chapel lamp.

Marriage

He married Isabelle de Meulan, daughter of Galéran IV de Meulan, widow from her first marriage to Geoffroy III de Mayenne on his return from the Holy Land about 1170 This alliance brought him the double support of the lords of Meulan and those of Mayenne.

From his marriage, contracted around 1170 with Isabelle de Mayenne, Maurice II had four sons and three daughters :

 Renaud;
 Maurice III;
 Pierre ecclesiastic;

 Amaury;
 Avoise, wife of Guy V de Laval;
 Clémence, wife of Pierre de la Garnache;
 Agnès, wife of Thibault II de Mathefelon.

Henry II of England

The time of Maurice II saw the rise of the house of Anjou. From 1152 the Lords of Anjou became vassals of Henry II of England, and, under his standard, obliged to combat France.

In 1174, following the revolt of the sons of Henry II against their father, Maurice II counted amongst the lords that had remained faithful to the King. Charged with leading the Angevins, he seized Chantoceaux and Sablé, destroyed Sablé's two neighbouring fortresses; Saint-Loup and Saint-Brice, and took over the government of Anjou and of Maine, as well as that of the recently constructed fortress at Ancenis.

The same year he figured amongst the witnesses of the Treaty of Falaise establishing peace between Henry II and his sons.

In 1177, following the agreement made between Louis VII and Henri II, he was predesignated as one of the arbitrators who would rule in the event of difficulties.

He was similarly nominated the 28 June 1180 for the peace signed at Gisors between Philippe-Auguste and Henri II.

Third Crusade

Richard the Lionheart, successor to Henry II, took with him a great number of his vassals but others were not going to join him until later; Maurice II was amongst these, for, in 1191, he was still in Anjou. We find no acts emanating from him at the time of
the departure for his first voyage to the Holy Land. For the second, however, many are known. including a testament dated
1191.

Testament

The testament portrays the state of the family of Maurice II in 1191. He identifies six children: three daughters, the eldest, and three sons. The eldest daughter Avoise de Craon, married Guy V de Laval; the second is not named, but Pierre de la Garnache, who held  the rank there is evidently her husband. The third, Agnès, is named, her dowry of Craon and Chantocé is specified, but the name of her husband is not given; as for the sons all three figure in their order of primogeniture.

Death

Maurice II returned to France and founded the priory of Bonshommes de Ballots near to Craon. He died 12 July 1196, resulting in the obituary of la Haye-aux-Bons-Hommes. The location of his tomb is not known, but it is known that his heart was taken to Savigny Abbey.

Anglo-Norman Poet

Maurice II was not only a great warrior and a man of faith; he was also a poet and amongst the songs of the trouvères of the Langue d'oïl, which have descended to us, there is one that one can legitimately be considered as being as his work that which begins by the verse: A l'entrant del doux termine.

Literature

Maurice II de Craon is the central character of the anonymous Middle High German verse romance Moriz von Craûn dated between 1187 and 1250. This, in turn, derives from a French fabliau: Du chevalier qui recovra l'amour de sa dame. The story tells of Maurice's attempts to woo "Isabel", depicted as the wife of his neighbour, Richard de Beaumont.

Cartulaire de Craon

See also 
 Craon family

Notes and references

Sources
derived from:
  2 volumes

Craon family
Christians of the Third Crusade
People from Mayenne
Year of birth uncertain
1196 deaths
Trouvères
Male classical composers